Aalesunds Handels- og Søfartstidende (The Ålesund Trade and Maritime Journal) was a newspaper published in Ålesund, Norway from 1856 to 1904. From 1872 to 1876 it was published under the name Aalesunds Tidende (The Ålesund Journal). It was the first newspaper published in Ålesund. The newspaper had a conservative stance.

References

Defunct newspapers published in Norway
Norwegian-language newspapers
Mass media in Møre og Romsdal
Ålesund
Publications established in 1856
Publications disestablished in 1904